Wet 'n Wild Emerald Pointe (often simply referred to as Wet 'n Wild or Emerald Pointe) is a water park located in Greensboro, North Carolina, United States, and part of the Wet 'n Wild chain. There are 40 rides and attractions, including 5 pools, 2 children's areas, and one of the largest wave pools in the country. The Themed Entertainment Association has ranked the park 20th in North America in terms of attendance, of which they had 407,000 visitors as of 2015. Major regional competitors are Carowinds' Carolina Harbor in Charlotte, North Carolina and Dollywood's Splash Waterpark in Pigeon Forge, Tennessee.

History

Originally named Aqua Gardens, the park opened in September 1983. From 1984 to 1986, it used the name Water Country USA. In 1986, it was purchased by a local company and renamed Emerald Pointe. In March 1999 Ogden Corp purchased the property, along with Raging Waters and Wet 'n Wild's assets, and renamed the park Wet 'n Wild Emerald Pointe. In 2019, the newest attraction "Bombs Away" was revealed at the end of the season to the public and was originally slated to open for the 2020 season. Due to the Covid-19 Pandemic, it has been delayed to open for the 2022 Season.

Rides and attractions

Current attractions

Former attractions

See also
 Wet 'n Wild (brand)

References

External links 

Palace Entertainment
Water parks in North Carolina
Companies based in Greensboro, North Carolina
1984 establishments in North Carolina
Tourist attractions in Greensboro, North Carolina
Buildings and structures in Greensboro, North Carolina
Amusement parks in North Carolina